Filmmaker refers to a person involved in filmmaking.

Filmmaker may also refer to:

 Filmmaker (film), a 1968 documentary film by George Lucas
 Filmmaker (magazine), a quarterly publication magazine covering issues relating to independent film

See also
 Film producer
 Film director